Henri Carel van Zanten (18 March 1957 – 22 May 2020) was a Dutch artist, based in Rotterdam.

Early life and education
Van Zanten was born in Rotterdam, but spent a large part of his youth in Canada and South Africa. Because of that he could easily adapt to new environments and languages.

He studied Slavic linguistics under professor Karel van het Reve.

Career
Van Zanten was introduced to the Stanislavski method by Piet Eelvelt. His mentor was the Belgian theatre reformer Jan Decorte. Van Zanten was active from 1982 as an artist, actor and director. Because of the many art disciplines he engaged himself in (such as theatre, performance art, street theatre, independent television production, sketch comedy, stand up comedy, acting and directing) he called himself an "omni artist".

He appeared as the Master of the Scream (narrator) in ’u’, the first Klingon opera.

He died in Berlin.

References

External links
Presenting ''u at FedCon 2010 (YouTube)
 Henri van Zanten on Wikiquote
 Henri van Zanten on Galeries.nl

1957 births
2020 deaths
Linguists of Klingon
Dutch male actors
Dutch male comedians
Dutch directors
20th-century Dutch male opera singers
Dutch performance artists
Dutch television producers
VJ (video performance artists)